De Shalit High School Complex is a high school located in Rehovot, Israel. The school was named after physicist Amos de-Shalit (1926–1969).

De Shalit has an enrollment of 2,000 students, from Rehovot and Kiryat Ekron. The school is affiliated with the Weizmann Institute of Science and many of its students participate in science-related projects organized by the Davidson Institute of Science Education.

See also
Education in Israel
Science and technology in Israel

References

External links 
  

High schools in Israel
Educational institutions established in 1946
1946 establishments in Mandatory Palestine
Buildings and structures in Rehovot